Sun Cruise Resort & Yacht is a hotel resort in Jeongdongjin on the east coast of South Korea.

Built at the top of a large cliff, the hotel looks out over the sea and gives the impression that a cruise ship has run aground.

The hotel has 211 rooms, including bedrooms and apartments, and six function rooms. There are six restaurants serving Korean and European food and a rotating bar on the top floor. Sporting facilities include a netted golf range, volleyball court, and a fitness club. The cruise ship theme is emphasised by the sound of crashing waves played on speakers throughout the hotel and the use of salt water in the swimming pool.

The resort also contains a park located adjacent to the hotel. Prominent within the landscaped gardens are "The Hands of Promise", two giant hands rising from the ground, along with a variety of other sculptures. There is also an observation area with a glass floor suspended above the sea, an exhibition hall, and a lake.

In 2003 the Titanic hotel, a construction with a similar cruise-ship theme, opened in Turkey.

See also
Jeongdongjin
Jeongdongjin station
Sea Train

References

Hotels in South Korea
Resorts in South Korea